Quincy-sous-Sénart (literally Quincy under Sénart) is a commune in the Essonne department in Île-de-France in northern France. The palaeographer and archivist Robert Marichal (1904–1999) died in Quincy-sous-Sénart.

Population
Inhabitants of Quincy-sous-Sénart are known as Quincéens in French.

International relations

Quincy-sous-Sénart is twinned with:
 Montemarciano, Italy
 Saue, Estonia

See also
Communes of the Essonne department

References

External links

Official website 
Mayors of Essonne Association 

Communes of Essonne